Marshall William Faulk (born February 26, 1973) is an American former football player who was a running back in the National Football League (NFL) for 13 seasons with the Indianapolis Colts and St. Louis Rams. He is widely regarded as one of the greatest running backs of all time.

Faulk played college football at San Diego State, where he was a two-time consensus All-American. He was selected by the Colts as the second overall pick in the 1994 NFL Draft; he was with the Colts for five seasons and played the last eight seasons of his career with the Rams. He was a member of the Greatest Show on Turf, a name given to the St. Louis Rams team that appeared in two Super Bowls and won Super Bowl XXXIV. In 2000, he was named the Most Valuable Player of the NFL. 

Faulk is one of only three NFL players to reach at least 10,000 rushing yards and 5,000 receiving yards and the only one to amass 12,000 yards rushing and 6,000 yards receiving. He was also an analyst for various programs on the NFL Network until December 2017. He was inducted to the Pro Football Hall of Fame in 2011 and the College Football Hall of Fame in 2017.

Early years
Faulk was born and raised in New Orleans, Louisiana. He attended Carver High School in the Ninth Ward of New Orleans, where he played for the Carver Rams high school football team. Also a standout track sprinter, Faulk was timed at 10.3 seconds in the 100 meters, 21.74 over 200 meters, and 49.4 in the 400 meters. While growing up he sold popcorn at New Orleans Saints games in the Louisiana Superdome.

During his final two years playing for Carver High, Faulk rushed 1,800 yards and scored thirty-two touchdowns. In his senior season, he also played defensive back, intercepting 11 passes and returning six of them for touchdowns.

College career

Faulk was heavily recruited by several major colleges, but due to his standout performance on defense, most of them recruited him to play the cornerback position. However, Faulk strongly desired to play the running back position in college. "I didn't love playing cornerback, so I knew I wouldn't be as successful in that position," Faulk told Sports Illustrated Kids. "You have to really love what you do to be a star." Ultimately he accepted an athletic scholarship to attend San Diego State University, because they were the first team to offer him a scholarship to play running back.

One of the best performances of his career was against the University of the Pacific on September 14, 1991, in just his second collegiate game. In 37 carries, he amassed 386 yards and scored seven touchdowns, both records for freshmen (the 386 yards were a then-NCAA record). "Faulk had scoring runs of 61, 7, 47, 9, 5, 8 and 25 yards." That performance sparked one of the greatest freshman seasons in NCAA history, gaining 1,429 yards rushing, with 23 total touchdowns (21 rushing), and 140 points scored. Faulk went on to better 1,600 yards rushing in his sophomore year. In Faulk's junior season in 1993, he was finally able to showcase his all-purpose ability by catching 47 passes for 640 yards and 3 touchdowns to go with 1,530 yards and 21 touchdowns on the ground. These numbers put Faulk 3rd in the nation in all-purpose yardage that year, and 2nd in scoring. Faulk left San Diego State University with many of the school's offensive records, among them 5,562 all-purpose yards and 62 career touchdowns, which is the 8th most in NCAA history.

After his 1992 season at SDSU, Faulk finished second in the Heisman Trophy award voting, losing to quarterback Gino Torretta in what was considered a notable snub in the history of the award. Torretta's 1992 Miami Hurricanes football team was undefeated in the regular season and ranked No. 1 in the country before the Heisman balloting, Faulk's team finished with a middling 5–5–1 record, continuing a trend of the Heisman going to the most notable player on one of the nation's best teams. ESPN analyst Lee Corso led a campaign supporting Torretta for the Heisman and left Marshall Faulk off of his ballot. Faulk was a Heisman finalist as well in 1991 (9th) and 1993 (4th).

In 1992, Faulk was named Arthur Ashe Sports Scholar Jr. by Diverse: Issues In Higher Education.

Professional career

1994 NFL Draft

Along with defensive tackle Dan Wilkinson and quarterbacks Heath Shuler and Trent Dilfer, Faulk was regarded as "one of the four players who rank well above the others in this draft". and on March 31, he ran a 4.35 forty-yard time at the San Diego State Pro Day. The Bengals had the No. 1 pick in the 1994 NFL Draft, and contemplated combining their heavy-duty runner Harold Green with the explosive Faulk, but eventually picked Wilkinson, leaving Faulk for the Indianapolis Colts.

Indianapolis Colts (1994–1998)
Faulk was drafted 2nd overall in the 1994 NFL Draft by the Indianapolis Colts, who were in desperate need of a running game. On July 25, 1994, Faulk signed a seven-year $17.2 million contract and received a $5.1 million signing bonus. Faulk responded by rushing for 1,282 yards, 11 touchdowns, and one receiving touchdown. The Colts improved to 8–8. Marshall Faulk, later that season, would become the first NFL player to win both the Offensive Rookie of the Year Award and the Pro Bowl's Most Valuable Player Award in the same season. He was also the first rookie to win Pro Bowl MVP.

The next season Faulk rushed for 1,078 yards and 14 total touchdowns. The Colts made the postseason, going 9–7, and narrowly missed the Super Bowl after a close loss to the Pittsburgh Steelers in the AFC Championship Game, which Faulk missed due to a nagging toe injury.

The next year was a miserable one for Faulk. Because of a toe injury he suffered earlier in the season, he rushed for only 587 yards, with a 3 yards-per-carry average. He led the Colts in yards from scrimmage with 1,015. He recovered from the injury and rushed for 1,000+ yards in each of the next two seasons, setting a new personal high with 1,319 in 1998. He also caught 86 passes for 906 yards that year (playing alongside rookie quarterback Peyton Manning) and was the NFL's leader in total yards from scrimmage with 2,227, beating out Denver's MVP running back Terrell Davis by 2 yards, while also finishing 4th in the league in receptions. It would also be the first of an NFL-record 4 consecutive 2,000+ total-yard seasons.

Faulk missed practices and was considering holding out for a new contract, and Colts president Bill Polian did not want his young team's chemistry damaged (especially with the budding Manning at the quarterback position).

St. Louis Rams (1999–2006)
Faulk was traded to the St. Louis Rams the following season for second- and fifth-round picks in the upcoming draft (which the Colts used to draft LB Mike Peterson and DE Brad Scioli). The Colts moved on at the position, drafting Edgerrin James in the first round. Faulk held out for 12 days as the details of his contract were worked out. On August 4, 1999, Faulk signed a seven-year, $45.2 million contract with the Rams, which was the biggest deal in team history at the time. In it, Faulk was guaranteed $9.6 million including a $7-million signing bonus. The problem in negotiations was the proposed fifth year, in which Faulk would get $7 million in salary and a $5-million roster bonus. The deal was structured to prevent Faulk from ever being tagged a transition or franchise player.

In his first year in St. Louis, Faulk was the catalyst for "The Greatest Show on Turf", a nickname given to coordinator Mike Martz's aggressive Coryell-style offense. In this offense, he put up some of the best all-purpose numbers in the history of the NFL. Faulk's patience and diligence in learning the Rams' offense paid off when he totaled an NFL record 2,429 yards from scrimmage, eclipsing Barry Sanders's record of 2,358 yards set in 1997 (Faulk's mark has since been broken by Chris Johnson in 2009). With 1,381 yards rushing (5.5 yards-per-carry average), 1,048 receiving yards, and scoring 12 touchdowns, Faulk joined Roger Craig as the only men at that time to total 1,000+ yards in each category in a season. He also broke the NFL season record for most receiving yards by a running back, previously held by Lionel James. The Rams eventually went on to win Super Bowl XXXIV. In the game, Faulk was contained on the ground by Tennessee Titans head coach Jeff Fisher's defensive scheme, limiting him to just 17 rushing yards. This was perhaps due to the Titans' inability to stop the Rams' passing game, of which Faulk was a major part, recording 5 receptions for 90 yards. His 90 receiving yards were the second-highest total by a running back in Super Bowl history. At the end of the season, he received the NFL Offensive Player of the Year Award and was a starter for the NFC squad in the 1999 Pro Bowl.

The following year, Faulk became the first running back in NFL history to lead his team in receptions five separate seasons (three in Indianapolis and twice in St. Louis). In addition, he was the NFL MVP and again the Offensive Player of the Year in 2000. He had 1,359 yards rushing in 14 games and set a new NFL record with 26 total touchdowns, (a record that would soon be broken by Priest Holmes and then later by Shaun Alexander and LaDainian Tomlinson), despite missing two games due to injury. He also averaged 5+ yards per carry again, this time with 5.4. The Rams, however, were not able to replicate the record they had the year prior. Even with the offense scoring the most points and yards during "The Greatest Show on Turf" era, the defense gave up 470 points.

The Rams returned to the Super Bowl the next year as their defense returned to form, allowing only 273 points, and the offense once again scored over 500 points, with 503. Faulk had another excellent season, rushing 260 times for a career-high 1,382 yards (5.3 yards per carry), and catching 83 passes for 765 yards, for an NFC-leading total of 2,147 yards from scrimmage (second in the NFL only to Priest Holmes, who totaled 2,169 yards) and scoring 21 touchdowns despite once again missing 2 games to injuries. Faulk won, for the third year in a row, the NFL's Offensive Player of the Year award, but finished second in a close vote to teammate Kurt Warner in the MVP vote. These years would be the climax of Faulk's career.

Faulk's injuries and age would soon catch up to him; 2001 was the last of his 1,000-yard rushing seasons, and though he was still employed as the Rams' primary running back following the 2001 season, he was no longer the player he was in his prime, despite remaining a respected and effective player.

On July 29, 2002, Faulk signed a new seven-year, $43.95 million contract with the Rams. Faulk was about to enter the fourth year of his 1999 contract. In this new contract Faulk received a $10.7 million signing bonus. In the 2002 season the Rams struggled and finished the year at 7–9. Faulk played in 14 games and started 10 and ended with 953 yards and 80 receptions. The following season, he played in and started 11 games, finishing with 818 yards and 45 receptions as the Rams rebounded with a 12–4 record.

In 2004, Faulk split time with rookie Steven Jackson and played in 14 games and rushing for 774 yards. In February 2005, Faulk agreed to a restructured contract to reduce his contract cap number. He was scheduled to make about $7.5 million in 2005. In the new contract received a total of $6 million in the next two seasons and a $2 million signing bonus was included. The 2005 season was Faulk's last in the NFL. He rushed for only 292 yards on 65 carries and caught 44 passes for 291 yards and one touchdown. This marked the only time in his career where he did not have a rushing touchdown.

Injuries and retirement
On July 21, the Rams announced that Faulk would undergo reconstructive knee surgery and miss the entire 2006 NFL season. During the season Faulk served as an analyst for the NFL Network's NFL Total Access.

During an NBC Sunday Night Football halftime show, Faulk was asked by one of the announcers, "So are you retired or not?" Faulk said that he was still a Ram, and would be a Ram for the rest of his life. He then said that if the Rams would have him back, he would play next year, as he was able to run full speed on his re-built knees, but on March 26, 2007, Faulk announced his retirement from football.

On November 29, 2007, the Rams announced that they would be retiring Faulk's number. The ceremony was during halftime of the Thursday night game against the Pittsburgh Steelers on December 20, 2007. In 2010 on the NFL Network's The Top 100: NFL's Greatest Players, Faulk was voted the number 70 player of all time.

In 2011, Faulk's first year of eligibility, he was elected into the Pro Football Hall of Fame. As a running back, he placed first in receiving yards (6,875), second in pass receptions (767), second in receiving touchdowns (36), third in yards from scrimmage (19,154), and tenth in rushing yards (12,280).

Faulk scored seven two-point conversions and it is an NFL record. He also has NFL records with five games of 250+ yards from scrimmage and 14 games of 200+ yards from scrimmage. He is the only player to have 70+ rushing touchdowns and 30+ receiving touchdowns.

NFL records
 Fastest player to gain 16,000 yards from scrimmage 129 games
 Fastest player to gain 17,000 yards from scrimmage: 142 games
 Fastest player to gain 1,000 yards from scrimmage in a season: 6 (1083 yards in 2000, tied with Jim Brown)
 Most two point conversions, career: 7
 Most consecutive seasons with 2,000 yards from scrimmage: 4
 Most consecutive seasons with 5+ rushing touchdowns: 10 (1994-2003, tied with LaDainian Tomlinson)
 Most consecutive games with 4+ touchdowns: 2 (tied with Jim Taylor and LaDainian Tomlinson)
 Most receiving yards by a running back in a season: 1,048
 Most consecutive games with a reception by a running back (min. 5 carries per game): 158
 Most games with 200 yards from scrimmage: 14
 Most games with 250 yards from scrimmage: 5
 Most games with both a rushing and receiving touchdown, career: 15
 Only player with 70+ rushing TDs and 30+ receiving TDs
 Only player with 12,000 yards rushing and 6,000 yards receiving in a career
 Only player to have 200 yards receiving and 50 yards rushing in the same game - December 26, 1999
 Only player to have 200 yards receiving and 10 rushing attempts in the same game - December 26, 1999

NFL career statistics

Regular season

Awards and honors

NFL
 Super Bowl champion (XXXIV)
 NFL Most Valuable Player (2000)
 3× NFL Offensive Player of the Year (1999–2001)
 NFL Offensive Rookie of the Year (1994)
 3× First-team All-Pro (1999–2001)
 3× Second-team All-Pro (1994, 1995, 1998)
 7× Pro Bowl (1994, 1995, 1998–2002)
 NFL rushing touchdowns leader (2000)
 2× NFL scoring leader 
 PFWA All-Rookie Team (1994)
 St. Louis Football Ring of Fame
 Indianapolis Colts Ring of Honor
 Los Angeles Rams No. 28 retired
 Bert Bell Award (2001)

College
 WAC Offensive Player of the Year (1992)
 3× First-team All-American (1991–1993)
 3× First-team All-WAC (1991-1993)
 San Diego State Aztecs No. 28 retired

Post-NFL career

Faulk was a longtime NFL Network analyst. He served as an analyst on NFL Total Access, where he provided a player's perspective on today's game. He also appeared on Thursday Night Football’s pre-game, halftime and post-game shows, and Sunday's NFL GameDay Morning. Faulk was suspended from the network on December 12, 2017, along with fellow ex-players Heath Evans and Ike Taylor, after sexual harassment allegations were made against the three by a former network wardrobe stylist.

Faulk played himself in season 1, episode 12 of the sitcom Life in Pieces. This episode first aired on January 7, 2016, on CBS.

Faulk was inducted into the Pro Football Hall of Fame in 2011 in his first year of eligibility. He was also inducted into the Indianapolis Colts Ring of Honor during the week 15 game against the Houston Texans on December 15, 2013, along with Eric Dickerson, another former Colt running back (who also played for the Rams, albeit when they were in Los Angeles).

Personal life
Faulk was married to Lindsay Stoudt from 2006 to 2014. He has six children, including three with Stoudt. His son, Marshall Faulk Jr., played running back for the Central Washington Wildcats.

Faulk has a charitable foundation in San Diego. His childhood friend Tyrone Wilson helped him start his foundation. Faulk is a cousin of Kevin Faulk, a former NFL running back.

In 2009, Faulk was inducted into the San Diego Hall of Champions.

See also
 List of NCAA Division I FBS players with at least 50 career rushing touchdowns
 List of NCAA major college football yearly rushing leaders
 List of NCAA major college football yearly scoring leaders
 List of National Football League career rushing yards leaders
 List of National Football League career all-purpose yards leaders
 List of National Football League annual rushing touchdowns leaders
 List of National Football League career rushing attempts leaders
 List of National Football League career rushing touchdowns leaders

References

External links

 
 
 
 

1973 births
Living people
African-American players of American football
African-American sports announcers
African-American sports journalists
All-American college football players
American Conference Pro Bowl players
American football running backs
American philanthropists
American sports journalists
American television sports announcers
College Football Hall of Fame inductees
Ed Block Courage Award recipients
Indianapolis Colts players
Los Angeles Rams announcers
National Conference Pro Bowl players
National Football League announcers
National Football League Most Valuable Player Award winners
National Football League Offensive Player of the Year Award winners
National Football League Offensive Rookie of the Year Award winners
National Football League players with retired numbers
Players of American football from Indianapolis
Players of American football from New Orleans
Pro Football Hall of Fame inductees
San Diego State Aztecs football players
St. Louis Rams players